St. Cloud Hotel is a historic two-story building in Chandler, Oklahoma. It was built in 1904 for John Edward Gormley. The hotel had the first elevator in Chandler. It has been listed on the National Register of Historic Places since April 5, 1984.

References

	
National Register of Historic Places in Lincoln County, Oklahoma
Hotel buildings completed in 1904
1904 establishments in Oklahoma Territory
Hotel buildings on the National Register of Historic Places in Oklahoma
Chandler, Oklahoma